The Advanced Heavy Lifter is a large helicopter project developed by Aviation Industry Corporation of China.

Development 

In 2009, Avic projected a  civil Advanced Heavy Lifter (AHL), likely also useful to the Chinese military.
In 2014, the 6,000 kW (8,000 hp) Chinese WZ-20 was reportedly selected.
In 2016, Avic took control, leaving Russian Helicopters as a supplier, presumably of the transmission.

To power it, China will choose between the Ivchenko Progress D-136T manufactured by Ukraine’s Motor-Sich, powering the current Mi-26, and the Russian  PD-12V turboshaft developed from the Aviadvigatel PD-14 core for an updated Mi-26.
After a $2 billion investment, AVIC hopes to produce 200.

Design 

The  takeoff weight and a  MTOW allow for a  internal payload or a  external one.
AVIC targets a range of 800 km (432 nmi), a cruise of 270 km/h (146 kn) and a  ceiling.
Design targets are closer to the Sikorsky CH-53K than the  MTOW Russian Mil Mi-26.
The  CH-53K is the largest US helicopter.

Specifications

See also

References

Further reading 
 

2010s Chinese civil utility aircraft
2010s Chinese helicopters
Proposed aircraft of China